The Atlantic wreckfish, (Polyprion americanus), also known as the stone bass or bass grouper,  is a marine, bathydemersal, and oceanodromous ray-finned fish in the family Polyprionidae. It has a worldwide, if disjunct, distribution in the Atlantic, Pacific and Indian Oceans.

Description
The Atlantic wreckfish is a large fish with a deep, robust body and a large head with a protruding lower jaw. The two dorsal fins are joined, the first has 11 spines with the final spine joined on to the second dorsal fin, which has 12 branched rays. The anal fin has a short base and has three robust spines. The caudal fin is broad and square. The body is covered with small, firmly attached scales which run up the base of the dorsal and anal fin. It has a large mouth and eyes. The preoperculum has a spiny margin while the operculum has a thick bony strut running horizontally  at eye level which terminates in a spine. The back and flanks are dark brown in colour with darker spots and blotches fading to yellowish on the belly. They have also been described as being Wreckfish are bluish grey on the back with a paler silvery sheen on the underside. The fins are blackish brown.

Distribution
The Atlantic wreckfish has a disjunct world wide distribution. It is found in the eastern Atlantic Ocean from Norway to South Africa, into the Mediterranean and including the Macaronesian Islands and Tristan da Cunha. In the western Atlantic it is found from Newfoundland to Argentina. In the western Indian Ocean it occurs around Île Saint-Paul and Île Amsterdam and in the southwestern Pacific Ocean it is found around New Zealand. It is also found off southern Australia from just north of Perth, Western Australia to Fraser Island in Queensland, including Tasmania.

Habitat and biology
Adult Atlantic wreckfish occur in and around caves, over rocky substrates and areas with densely scattered boulders, natural reefs and shipwrecks, a habitat which has led to species' common name. It is normally a solitary species but the adults gather to breed during the summer. The juveniles form shoals for protection from predators which swim and hunt small fish in mid-water. Once they attain a length of  they become solitary and look for a territory on the bottom. It is thought that the Atlantic wreckfish can live for as much as ninety years. They feed mainly on bottom dwelling fish, squid and cuttlefish but they will also take crustaceans and octopuses. They are probably best described as opportunistic, with one record of a ROV camera filming a large congregation of small sharks feeding on a dead swordfish, with one of them being caught and swallowed whole by this species of wreckfish.

They have no known predators as adults, but juvenile specimens may be threatened by large bony fishes or sharks.

Conservation and usage
The Atlantic wreckfish is a commercially valuable species and is valued as a food fish in some parts of its range. Large wreckfish may be divided into steaks, while smaller fish are filleted or baked whole. In North and South America wreckfish are sold frozen in supermarkets or grocery stores or marketed fresh from fish counters. They are caught in trawler nets or by long lines and gill nets, or occasionally by small-scale fisheries which use rod and line. Overall the stock is assessed by the IUCN as data deficient but some stocks, such as the Mediterranean stock have been assessed as being at greater risk.

References 

Polyprionidae
Fish described in 1801